The Undine Apartments is a historic apartment complex in Omaha, Nebraska. It was built in 1918 by the Traver Brothers Company, a real estate development company founded by Charles Traver. Its construction was made possible in this location thanks to the advent of the streetcar. Undine Apartments has been listed on the National Register of Historic Places since March 12, 2008.

References

External links

National Register of Historic Places in Omaha, Nebraska
Residential buildings completed in 1918
1918 establishments in Nebraska